Modisto de señoras ("Ladies' Fashion Designer" or "Fashion Designer for Ladies" in English) is a 1969 Mexican sex comedy film directed by René Cardona Jr., and starring Mauricio Garcés, Zulma Faiad, Irma Lozano, Claudia Islas and Patricia Aspíllaga. It is considered perhaps "the most popular and representative" of the series of films that featured Garcés as an upper middle class ladies' man.

Plot
D'Maurice (Mauricio Garcés) is a fashion designer who pretends to be effeminate in order to fit into the world of haute couture, and taking advantage of that appearance, D'Maurice, a womanizer, seduces all his female clients while making fun of all their husbands, who confidently believe they leave their wives in good hands, such as Rebeca (Claudia Islas), the young and beautiful wife of the rich Don Álvaro, (Carlos López Moctezuma), a parody of the typical nouveau riche in the high society of Mexico. Suspecting the deception, his competitors, Perugino, Antoine and Mao (Enrique Rocha, Hugo Goodman and Carlos Nieto respectively), determined to unmask him, hire a detective (who is also effeminate) and a beautiful woman (Patricia Aspíllaga) to obtain evidence to ruin D'Maurice. Meanwhile, Magda (Irma Lozano), a beautiful waitress, falls in love with the gallantry of D'Maurice, while worrying about his sudden swings from extreme manliness to effeminacy. D'Maurice in turn confronts Luigi, a dangerous mobster, by getting involved with his mistress, Doris (Zulma Faiad), a renowned Argentine vedette with no talent other than a voluptuous beauty.

Cast
Mauricio Garcés as D'Maurice
Zulma Faiad as Doris Martell
Irma Lozano as Waitress / Mrs. Mendoza Robles
Claudia Islas as Rebeca
Enrique Rocha as Perugimo
Hugo Goodman as Antoine
Carlos Nieto as Mao
Carlos López Moctezuma as Don Alvaro
Patricia Aspíllaga as Barbara
Raúl Meraz as Luigi
Irlanda Mora as Irlanda
Queta Carrasco (as Enriqueta Carrasco)
Alma Thelma as Thelma (as Alma Thelma Domínguez) 
Armando Acosta
Julia Acher
René Barrera
Juan Garza
Queta Lavat as Condesa / Cuquis (uncredited)
Enrique Pontón as Spy cameraman (uncredited)

Analysis
The film has been noted for featuring male gay characters, and as such has been considered an example of an LGBT-themed Mexican film. José César del Toro noted the symbolism of Garcés's character being stated to be 41 years old, as 41 is a number associated with homosexuality in Mexican popular culture, and Karen Cordero and Iván Acebo Choy in Sin centenario ni bicentenario: revoluciones alternas said that "the actor's charisma and his command of comedy even manage to make [his character's] sexual ambiguity to be seen as pertinent within the plot; ultimately it's just a tool for his conquests."

References

External links

1969 films
1960s Spanish-language films
1969 LGBT-related films
1960s sex comedy films
Films directed by René Cardona Jr.
Films about fashion
LGBT-related sex comedy films
Mexican LGBT-related films
Mexican sex comedy films
1960s Mexican films